Charles Francis Murphy (February 9, 1890 – May 22, 1985) was an American architect based in Chicago, Illinois.

Biography
Born in Jersey City, New Jersey, Murphy was educated at the De La Salle Institute in Chicago. His first job was as a secretary, joining the offices of D.H. Burnham & Company in 1911 and he was steadily promoted to become personal secretary to the architect Ernest Graham.

After Graham died in 1936, Murphy moved on to co-found the architectural practice Shaw, Naess & Murphy with Alfred P. Shaw and Sigurd E. Naess (1886 - 1970). Murphy had no formal training as an architect at the time. He was next part of Naess & Murphy. The practice was later renamed C. F. Murphy Associates and later Murphy/Jahn Inc. in 1983 when Helmut Jahn took over as president.

Murphy was awarded an honorary degree from St. Xavier University in 1961, and became a fellow of the American Institute of Architects in 1964.

Selected buildings
Miami Herald building (1960)
Richard J. Daley Center (1965)
 Blue Cross-Blue Shield Building (1968)
McCormick Place, Chicago (1970) convention center rebuilt following a fire in 1967
O'Hare Airport’s original Terminal 1, and current Terminals 2 and 3
J. Edgar Hoover Building

References

External links
 Interview at the Art Institute of Chicago
 Murphy/Jahn
 Charles F Murphy death notice
 Josephine Murphy death notice
 Jahn website
 Chicago Tribune article announcing firm name change

1890 births
1985 deaths
Artists from Jersey City, New Jersey
Artists from Chicago
20th-century American architects
Architects from New Jersey